Niggles may refer to:

A symptom of decompression sickness
"Leaf by Niggle", a short story by J. R. R. Tolkien